Nehydriris is a monotypic moth genus of the family Crambidae described by Eugene G. Munroe in 1974. It contains only one species, Nehydriris excellens, described by the same author in the same year, which is found in Rio de Janeiro, Brazil.

References

Spilomelinae
Taxa named by Eugene G. Munroe
Crambidae genera
Monotypic moth genera